Cacostatia acutipennis is a moth of the subfamily Arctiinae. It was described by Rothschild in 1912. It is found in Colombia.

The wingspan is about 42 mm. The forewings are black-brown slightly glossed with blue. The hindwings are hyaline.

References

Arctiinae
Moths described in 1912